Anaspis brevicornis is a species of beetles of the family Scraptiidae. It is endemic to Cape Verde, where it occurs on the islands of Santo Antão and Fogo. The species was described by Thomas Vernon Wollaston in 1867.

References

Scraptiidae
Beetles of Africa
Beetles described in 1867
Insects of Cape Verde